The Regulatory Reform Act 2001 (c.6) is an Act of the Parliament of the United Kingdom. It replaced the Deregulation and Contracting Out Act 1994. It removed some of the constraints on Deregulation Orders under the 1994 Act, by providing wider powers for government ministers to make a Regulatory Reform Order by statutory instrument.

The Act was introduced to the House of Lords on 7 December 2000, and passed to the House of Commons on 19 March 2001. It passed its Report Stage and Third Reading on 4 April 2001.

Under the 2001 Act, a government minister can make a Regulatory Reform Order to "[reform] legislation which has the effect of imposing burdens", with a view to removing or reducing the regulatory burdens. The Act can only be used to reform existing legislation, so cannot be used to codify the common law, and can only be used where burdens are removed (although, unlike the 1994 Act, new burdens can also be imposed where proportional). An Order cannot be used to remove "necessary protections". The draft Order must be opened to public consultation, reviewed by Committees from both Houses of Parliament, and then approved by both Houses of Parliament. However, they are not debated on the floor of either chamber, unlike a Bill.

The Act provided for four Deregulation Orders that were moving through the approval process to be completed. Between enactment in April 2001 and July 2005, the Act was used to pass 27 Regulatory Reform Orders. For example, to make orders to remove restrictions on business tenancies; to liberalise rules on gaming machines; to extend licensing hours for New Year's Eve 2001; and, for the Queen's Golden Jubilee, to remove the 20-partner limit on partnerships, and to rationalise legislation on fire safety.

The Act has been largely replaced by the Legislative and Regulatory Reform Act 2006. The Act expands the range of ministerial order-making powers, allowing orders to be made in a wider range of circumstances, more quickly and efficiently, with less consultation and scrutiny.

See also
 List of regulatory reform orders

References
Halsbury's Statutes. Fourth Edition. 2008 Reissue. Volume 41. Page 1088.

External links
Text of the Act, from the Office of Public Sector Information.
Explanatory notes to the Act, from Office of Public Sector Information.
Developments since enactment from the Cabinet Office.

United Kingdom Acts of Parliament 2001
Economics of regulation
Law reform in the United Kingdom